Sri Shivarudra Balayogi Maharaj (born 20 September 1954), born Srinivas (Seenu) Dikshitar in Kolar in the South Indian state of Karnataka, is a self realised Yogi and a direct disciple of Shri Shivabalayogi Maharaj.

After meeting his Guru at the age of sixteen, Seenu performed 20 years of vigorous service and meditation under Shri Shivabalayogi's guidance at his Dehradun ashram in the foothills of the Himalayas. Soon after the death of his Guru in 1994, Srinivas entered a stage known as tapas—intense and unbroken dhyana (meditation) in which the mind is kept in perfect thoughtlessness. By performing tapas for around 20 hours a day continuously for five years, he achieved Enlightenment/Self Realization. Based in the Dehradun ashram, he now travels to many parts of the world teaching meditation and continuing his Guru's mission. He has established numerous meditation groups in the United States, United Kingdom, Australia, Malaysia, Singapore and around India.

Hinduism Today has written that, "Thousands have been inspired by his influence" and "When the famous Sri Sri Sri Shivabalayogi Maharaj passed away in 1994, meditators around the world wondered who would take his place."  Shivarudra Balayogi is counted as one of the few disciples who completed at least five years of tapas, and is revered by many followers as the successor of his Guru's legacy. In his book on Indian spirituality, renowned Vedanta scholar Adwaita P. Ganguly writes, "Baba Shivarudra Balayogi is the embodiment of gentleness, compassion and service to humanity. He is also resolute and immovable as Silence itself".

Life

Beginning 
Shivarudra Balayogi was born Srinivas Dikshitar on 20 September 1954 to a pious Brahmin family in Kolar in the South Indian state of Karnataka. The youngest of four children (including Vijay Kumar, Vijaya Lakshmi, Satyanarayana), he was affectionately known as 'Seenu.' His father, Shankara Dikshitar, was a doctor who dedicated much of his time to serving the poor without charge. Seenu drew inspiration from a young age from his mother's example of fervent devotion and inner strength.

Awakening 
Srinivas had begun to experience an acute spiritual hunger by the age of five. At the age of six or seven, he became mesmerised upon hearing his sister singing Bhaja Govindam, composed by the great Yogi-teacher Adi Shankaracharya. The spiritually precocious child immediately learned the Sanskrit verses, began singing them and contemplating their meaning. A sudden detachment (vairagya) dawned, as a result of Adi Shankaracharya's exhortation:

Sing the Glory of God and adopt His consciousness into your mind, for when the end comes to the physical body, none of your worldly scholarship, wealth or possessions are going to come to your rescue.

Seenu's mind became obsessed with thoughts of birth and death: "What is the use of living if we are simply going to die?", "Do we come into being with our physical body, and do we die with this body?",  "If one is truly the Immortal Soul, the Consciousness beyond birth and death, why is it that we are unaware of it?",  "If happiness exists, why is it that we do not have it all the time, 24 hours a day, 7 days a week?"

Srinivas had become uncomfortable with the sight of the world, and wondered whether there was a technology to "switch off" the universe.

Guru 
During his teenage years, Seenu spent much of his time at various temples around his home, sitting quietly by himself. He would contemplate the meaning of jnana (knowledge), bhakti (devotion) and vairagya (detachment) from the teachings of Adi Shankaracharya, and longed for a Guru of the calibre of Shri Ramakrishna Paramahamsa and Shri Ramana Maharshi.

At the age of fifteen, Seenu began to secretly meditate in the isolated Nagara Theertha cave in the Chamundi hills (outside Mysore) several days a week instead of going to school. At the age of sixteen, Srinivas was led to the great Shri Shivabalayogi Maharaj through a series of unusual events. Having performed a heroic twelve-year tapas (intense meditation) at the age of fourteen, Shivabalayogi Maharaj was known for his powerful presence and dazzling aura of peace. In a dream, on the night before meeting His Guru, Swamiji initiated Seenu into a mantra, which was to become an anchor for his mind on the path to Self Realization:.

Om Shivaya Shivabalayogendraya Parabrahmanaya

Taking Swamiji's darshan the next day, Seenu fell in love with his Guru at first sight, and his mind became totally concentrated on the form of Shivabalayogi. After communicating his desire to leave home immediately to serve in Shri Shivabalayogi's mission, Srinivas was persuaded by his mother to wait three years to make sure his feelings were genuine. During this period, Seenu would visit Swamiji in Bangalore. While waiting for the time to pass and continuing his studies at Mysore College, Srinivas would practice the technique of dhyana meditation into which he had been initiated by His Guru – this was to be his technology for "switching off" the universe. In September 1974, at the age of nineteen, Seenu finally received his mother's blessing and was accepted into Swamiji's service. Shivabalayogi sent Seenu to manage his ashram in Dehradun, in the foothills of the Himalayas, and trained him in a close Guru-disciple relationship.

Sadhana 
Life at the ashram marked a new period in Srinivas's sadhana (spiritual practice). His daily practice was gruelling involving cleaning the entire ashram, cooking, 4–5 hours of meditation, as well as performing the ashram puja (worship) and evening bhajans (devotional songs). In addition to these duties, Swamiji charged Seenu with taking care of two mentally retarded boys, one of whom he looked after for thirteen years, and both of whom died in his arms as he chanted and prayed. His Guru tested him in many ways, often scolding him harshly for up to an hour at a time. Adopting the methods of karma yoga (service) and bhakti yoga (devotion), Seenu took it as a spiritual blessing. One day Shivabalyogi Maharaj remarked:

Look at the faith and attachment that Seenu has. Even if I cut him into pieces and throw him in the river, he will get joined back up and come back to me.

On an early trip to Rishikesh for a bath in the river Ganges, Swamiji saw the poonal (sacred thread worn by the Brahmin priest caste) on Seenu's body and became furious, yelling "Why are you having this thread? It will simply give you the ego that you belong to a higher caste, which is not at all proper on the spiritual path." He instructed Seenu to offer the thread to Mother Ganges, which Seenu did at once, immersing the thread in the water. Then Shivabalayogi Maharaj sprinkled Ganges water on Seenu's head and slapped him on the back, declaring "From now, remember that you are a sannyasi (monk). You must live a simple life so that people themselves can call you a monk, but you yourself should not become egoistic by claiming or boasting of any status as such."

On 20 September 1978—Seenu's 24th birthday—he asked Swamiji to bless some vibhuti (sacred ash) and place him into tapas (intense meditation performed for several years). Blessing the vibhuti, Swamiji said, "If you want to sit for tapas now, I can make you sit for tapas; but if you sit for tapas now, instead of successfully completing it you might acquire some ego and you may even go away from me physically and may not be able to serve in my mission."  To this Seenu replied, "Swamiji, then I do not want to do tapas. Because what I want is Swamiji, that's all I know. I love you and I want to be in Swamiji's mission. I want to serve you only. Whether I get Realized or not, that is not so important for me. But definitely I would like to remain at your lotus feet and serve you forever."  Then Swamiji smiled, saying "Take this vibhuti and keep it with you. In due course of time, when the time is ripe, you will get what you want.".

Tapas 
On 28 March 1994, Shri Shivabalayogi Maharaj died. Upon completion of the Mahasamadhi ceremony, Seenu immediately travelled to Mysore, walking out onto the Chamundi Hills where he had first met his Guru Shivabalayogi and where he used to secretly spend his days in meditation as a teenager.

Going into deep meditation for two to three days, he was roused by a vision of his Guru Shri Shivabalayogi, who informed him that the time had come to do tapas.  Thinking that this might be an illusion created by his grieving mind, Seenu ignored the vision.  On 10 November 1994, after the evening arathi (salute with lights ceremony), Seenu witnessed the shining figure of Sri Shivabalayogi manifesting from the photo kept on the dais in the darshan hall, and leading him into a neighbouring room:

As I was closing my eyes, it felt as if I was sinking into a deep sea of space.  Total darkness had engulfed, total silence and serenity was there.  Nothing else seemed to be there.  No thoughts were coming.  In that state I heard a strong voice telling me, 'Look, from this room either you have to come out as a Yogi, or your dead body shall come out.  Do not abandon the practice under any circumstances until you reach the goal.  I want you do this for five years as you already have the fruits of seven years of tapas. (Beyond Bliss, 2006).

Deep meditation continued unbroken for two or three days.  He then resumed meditation for around 20 hours a day in seven- to eight-hour cycles.

In the fourth year of tapas, the name "Shiva Rudra Balayogi" was bestowed upon him by Shri Shivabalayogi.  Swamiji instructed his Yogi-disciple to begin giving darshan to devotees, and thus Shivarudra Balayogi came to be affectionately known by devotees who visited as Babaji (revered father).

On 16 November 1999, five years after he commenced tapas, Shivarudra Balayogi experienced the dazzling manifestation of the deity Ardhanarishwara—half the body of Lord Shiva and half the body of Goddess Parvati. They said, "Now that we have come due to your tapas, you do not require your Guru and can go ahead to get many followers." This was the final test for any remnant of ego. Babaji spontaneously replied:

I want only the lotus feet of my Guru.  I offer my life at the lotus feet of the Divine Guru who helped and guided me to this.  So please, if you want to bless me, bless me that I can always remain at the lotus feet of my Guru and serve him and work according to my Guru's guidance... there is no other desire.  (Guru-Disciple, 2008)

Pleased with this reply, they blessed the Yogi and the manifestation was withdrawn back into the Self. In their place, Shivabalayogi then manifested. He directed his Yogi-disciple, "After you come out of tapas, inspire the people of this world to practice this dhyana meditation and know themselves. Through this practice they can achieve total Peace."<ref>Young, B., 2008, Guru-Disciple, p. 238; >Guru's Feet Online Biography.</.</ref> Shri Swamiji then explained: "I am actually the Divine, your real Self. I have manifested through the power of Maya (illusion technology) in this form which is dearest to you, as Guru." Shortly after this, Shri Shivarudra Balayogi Maharaj achieved the final Nirvikalpa Samadhi in which all individuality was absorbed in the Self, permanently composed in Supreme Peace. On 23 November 1999, Babaji emerged from his room as the Yogi, Shri Shivarudra Balayogi Maharaj.

Mission 

As word of his tapas spread, spiritual seekers from various parts of the world sought Babaji out at his base in the Dehradun ashram, at the foothills of the Himalayas.   He now travels the world at the invitation of devotees to continue Shri Shivabalayogi's mission, as directed by his Guru.

In keeping with the tradition established by his Guru, initiation into the Jangama dhyana meditation technique that Babaji used to achieve Self Realization is given without charge and in the attitude of a friend (mitra bhava). He does not require students who come to him to have any particular faith or accept him as Guru. While training monastic disciples, he emphasises that true renunciation (sannyas) occurs in the mind and encourages householders to perform meditation and service while retaining their way of life.

Teachings 

The teachings of Shri Shivarudra Balayogi are difficult to define because they are based on his direct experience rather than any particular scripture or school of Indian philosophy. Nevertheless, his philosophy is consistent with the Vedanta:

Every one, consciously or unconsciously, is searching for peace and happiness. You are suffering because you have forgotten your real Self. Once you Realize that you are this Immortal Self, you will Realize that your very existence is Permanent and Supreme Peace.

In practical terms, his teaching is based on the Jangama dhyana meditation technique, which was taught to him by his Guru Shri Shivabalayogi Maharaj. He also guides students on the bhakti marga (path of devotion) and karma marga (path of service), according to their temperament.

 On meditation:  "It is only a purifying process when you try to meditate. The mind is the tape which has acquired habits and brain acts as tape recorder. When you sit for meditation the mind gets applied (sucked) onto the brain because of its habits. Purifying process starts when the vasanas (impressions) are getting evaporated. Visions and sounds get created by a decodifying method from the brain. Then is the time you require enormous patience to allow it to happen. Then you should not analyze or judge what it is, good or bad just allow it to happen. Then only the mind can recede."
 On miracles: "Efforts can bring miracles. Achieving Supreme Peace through sadhana is the real miracle.  Rings and chains cannot give Peace to this world and are easily available in shops. For a few hundred dollars one can fly in the air. I have always said that if someone can wave the hand and give Peace to the world, that day I will consider it a miracle."
 On bhava samadhi: "Every individual must be careful if they are genuinely interested in going towards Enlightenment. One should not imagine and deceive oneself by claiming to be some divine authority. One has to be very careful about bhava samadhi. My Guru said that it is like giving a lollipop to a child, to make them go to school. But, unfortunately, people sometimes get stuck to the lollipop and they do not go to school."
 On mind and brain: "The brain is in touch with the nervous system and the universe.  Through its reflections, the mind, which is a spark of the Supreme Consciousness called the Self, comes into existence.  The mind assumes everything that is reflected by the brain is real, recognizes and absorbs as an imprint, and starts wandering in the universe aimlessly – getting pampered, losing control, losing consciousness of the Self."
 On the branches of Vedanta: "Adi Shankaracharya spread the teaching of 'advaita' – only one single self exists. A contemporary of Shankaracharya was Ramanujacharya. He taught, "We are a spark of the Divine only." At the same time the school of philosophy connected to Madhvacharya expressing devotion taught, "That individual 'jivatma' is separate from God." These three are not different – there is no disunity. In the beginning, you see yourself as God's devotee. At the next stage you experience you are part of God – like a ray from the Sun or a droplet from the ocean. Finally in Nirvikalpa Samadhi, only one single Self exists; the ancient sages used the term 'Tat' which means 'That'."
 On bhakti yoga: "Because of imagination only the mind has gone out of control. This is the basic technique of the bhakti marga (devotional path). Using the same imagination the mind is to be brought back to its concentrated position, the composed position. So rituals and form worship or formlessness, they are all prescribed so that you can begin somewhere if you need an anchor, so that your mind can lose all other imaginations and become single-pointed into one imagination. Even it is advised during meditation also, if there are thousands of thoughts coming, you are unable to lose all the thoughts, try to stick to one particular thought before giving up all such thoughts. So that is how the worship of an idol in the temple and rituals are all prescribed."
 On karma yoga: "When you are doing karma (any work), do it without trying to analyze or judge anything. Then your Mind would surrender to the Divine Guru and that action (all such work) can get converted into sadhana. Specifically if you are trying to repeat any name of the Divine Guru, just concentrate on the name (or japa or chant) and observe from where it is coming. Your mind gets absorbed there, converting such action (sadhana) into deeper and deeper sadhana. While you try to meditate also do the same. Allow the mind to get purified without trying to imagine what it is. When vision or any experience happens do not try to see whether it is good or bad, right or wrong. Remember either way the mind gets involved and is in existence always. If you simply watch and do not bother what it is, then the mind recedes. When it recedes it is going towards its original abode, the Divine, which is beyond all imaginations and explanations."
  On surrender: "The mind can never tell the truth because it can tell you only based on its own imaginations. So meditation can definitely help you to really surrender, technologically surrender in every way. Surrender means that the mind has to become quiet. Not simply if we touch our heads and do a deep prostration do we convey surrender."
 On Samadhi: "Samadhi is when the mind totally gets absorbed into the Real Ultimate Self. The yogi becomes aware of the Self's existence but without any definitions. Even the earlier imagined false self's identity also vanishes. This means the thought of 'I' vanishes. In Samadhi, the Yogi has no mind which recognizes or identifies anything. The Yogi simply experiences the Existence, which is Supreme Peace."
 On the Yogi: "The Ultimate Truth is Supreme Consciousness which is all-pervading.  A Yogi experiences the Self's existence in Nirvikalpa Samadhi.  There will not be an iota of imagination, not even the thought of 'I' or 'Existence', but you experience the existence.  A Yogi remains there effortlessly with contentment."
 On Self: "This has to be experienced. Nobody else can do it for you. You cannot demonstrate it to anyone else, or define it in words. Just like you cannot simply define what space is, and you cannot measure space by any scale. It is all pervading. It is an amazing thing. If at all you want to measure the space and know the space, you have to become space itself."

References

Further reading
Ganguly, Adwaita P., 2007, Shri Shivarudra Balayogi Maharaj, in India Travel Guide: Spiritual Tourism and Ground Realities, *Vedantic Research Publications
Malik, R., 2001, A Yogi Worth Watching, Hinduism Today, November/December
Young, Bruce, 2006, Beyond Bliss,
Young, Bruce, 2008, Guru-Disciple,
Young, Bruce (Author) and Reitze, Simon (Translator), 2018, Guru-Shishya: Das Leben von Shri Shri Shri Shivabalayogi Maharaj und Sein Vermächtnis (SRBY UK).
Hopkins, Charles, 2006, His Master's Grace,
Hopkins, Charles and Carol, 2007, From the Heart of Peace,

Indian yoga teachers
Living people
1954 births